The 2009 San Marino and Rimini Riviera motorcycle Grand Prix was the thirteenth round of the 2009 Grand Prix motorcycle racing season. It took place on the weekend of 4–6 September 2009 at the Misano World Circuit. The MotoGP race was won by Valentino Rossi who extended his lead in the championship to 30 points.

MotoGP classification

250 cc classification

125 cc classification

Championship standings after the race (MotoGP)
Below are the standings for the top five riders and constructors after round thirteen has concluded.

Riders' Championship standings

Constructors' Championship standings

 Note: Only the top five positions are included for both sets of standings.

References

San Marino and Rimini Riviera motorcycle Grand Prix
San Marino
San Marino and Rimini